Chief Justice of the Federal Court may refer to:
Chief Justice of Malaysia
Chief Justice of Canada's Federal Court.
Chief Justice of the Federal Court of Australia